was a Japanese track and field athlete. He competed in the men's high jump at the 1932 Summer Olympics.

References

1908 births
Year of death missing
Place of birth missing
Japanese male high jumpers
Olympic male high jumpers
Olympic athletes of Japan
Athletes (track and field) at the 1932 Summer Olympics
Japan Championships in Athletics winners